Elections to the Adur District Council were held on 1 May 1980, with one third of the council up for election. There was an additional vacancy in the Southwick Green ward, and no elections for the single-member ward St Marys. Overall turnout dropped to 48.7%.

The election resulted in the Liberals gaining control of the council from the Conservatives.

Election result

This resulted in the following composition of the council:

Ward results

+/- figures represent changes from the last time these wards were contested.

References

1980
1980 English local elections
1980s in West Sussex